Adrian Legg (born 16 May 1948) is an English guitar player who has been called "impossible to categorize". He plays custom guitars that are a hybrid of electric and acoustic, and his fingerstyle picking technique has been acknowledged by the readers of Guitar Player who voted Legg the "best acoustic fingerstyle" player four years in a row (1993–1996).

From his early start as a bench technician customising electric guitars, Legg moved into guitar instruction, publishing books and videos on guitar technique. In 1996 and 1997, Legg shared the stage with acclaimed guitar experts Joe Satriani, Eric Johnson and Steve Vai as part of the G3 tour. Vai called Legg "Uncle Adrian" and Satriani said of Legg's musicianship, "He's simply the best acoustic guitar player I've ever heard. I don't know anyone else who can create such a cascade of beautiful notes... Adrian plays like he's got hammers for fingers."

Early career

Legg was born in Hackney, London, England. He studied the oboe as a child but in teenage years his interest shifted to the guitar.

In the early 1970s, Legg won both the composition and performance sections of a competition run by the now defunct Guitar magazine, published by Musical New Services of Denmark Street, which led to his being asked to contribute articles to the magazine.  From then on, his technical flair produced a stream of articles in UK music press in the 1970s and early 1980s, culminating in the 1981 Kaye and Ward book "Customising Your Electric Guitar." He spent from 1979 to 1981 as a technician at Rose Morris Ltd., who then handled Marshall amplification, Ovation Guitar and Takamine Guitars, and designed original and well-reviewed passive circuits for the then relaunched Vox guitars. In 1990, he was involved in the prototyping and launch of the highly successful Trace Acoustic amplifiers, and continues to maintain technical relationships with the musical instrument industry.

From a 1983 promotional flyer (Technopickers) from Spindrift Records; having demonstrated Ovation guitar for a number of years and with sessions with Tom Robinson, a tour with Richard Thompson and appearing on Radio One's in Concert programme all have helped established Adrian.

Going global
Legg's first US release, Guitars and Other Cathedrals in 1990, pleased guitar fans. Over the years, he's played at the Montreux Jazz Festival and toured with Richard Thompson, David Lindley, Joe Satriani, Eric Johnson and as part of the G3 Tour featuring Satriani, Johnson and Favored Nations founder Steve Vai. For G3, Legg served as an opening act in 1996 and a headlining act in 1997. An infrequent singer, Legg helped with vocal duties on the collaborative G3 performance of Red House by Jimi Hendrix.

He has also shared the wealth of his talent and experience with teaching DVDs, videos and books. In recent years, he has also been a commentator-at-large for National Public Radio's "All Things Considered", and even more recently, regular listeners have heard his guitar versions of the show's theme music.

Style

Legg plays fingerstyle guitar, mixing an alternating-bass style with harmonics, banjo-peg retuning and single or double-string bending. Often he will play a piece entirely in arpeggios similar to a classical guitar style. He makes extensive use of altered tunings and capos.

Legg has said that his true home is onstage. "Playing live is the whole point... Everyone makes a journey, an effort; we all come together – me, the audience, the people who run the venue – to share this wonderful, universal, human emotional interaction. This is where music lives."

A significant part of a performance by Legg is the wryly funny storytelling patter he uses between songs, some of these stories included on Adrian Legg Live (2017). His distinctive wit is also in written evidence everywhere from his liner notes to his tablature books.

Legg included the use of modeling technology and MIDI for fingerstyle guitar on his 2004 album Inheritance, which features extensive use of guitar synthesisers and modeled guitar sounds. This stands in contrast to the more acoustic sound of Guitar Bones.

In an interview with Frets, a Guitar Player publication, Adrian listed some of the signal processors and effects that he utilizes to shape his acoustic tone.  This included several notable effects boxes such as the Effectrode PC-2A compressor, a Wampler Pedals Black '65 Overdrive, and an Effeectrode Helios fuzz. Adrian is also endorsed by Neunaber Audio and is currently using a Neunaber Audio Immerse Reverberator for his reverb needs.

Discography

Albums

Videos

Compilations
Full Moon	(1997)
The Ultimate Guitar Survival Guide (1993)
Relativity: Here and Now... Musical Masters (1991)

References

External links
Adrian Legg Official website

G3 (tour)
20th-century British guitarists
21st-century British guitarists
Chamber jazz guitarists
Living people
1948 births
English jazz guitarists
English male guitarists
Fingerstyle guitarists
British male jazz musicians
Favored Nations artists
Red House Records artists
20th-century British male musicians
21st-century British male musicians